A list of films produced by the Marathi language film industry based in Maharashtra in the year 1997.

1997 Releases
A list of Marathi films released in 1997.

References

Lists of 1997 films by country or language
 Marathi
1997